Allegheny Baptist Church, known since 1890 as the Free Methodist Church of Pleasantville, is a historic Baptist church located at Pleasantville, Venango County, Pennsylvania.  It was built between 1847 and 1849, and is a one-story, frame building, three bays by four bays, with a square tower. It features a wide, recessed front entrance. The tower includes a bell tower that rises 22 feet above the roof.

It was listed on the National Register of Historic Places in 1978.

References

Churches on the National Register of Historic Places in Pennsylvania
Churches completed in 1849
19th-century Baptist churches in the United States
Churches in Venango County, Pennsylvania
1849 establishments in Pennsylvania
National Register of Historic Places in Venango County, Pennsylvania